-vac (most often -evac -ovac) is a toponymic suffix predominant in Serbia and Croatia, indicating a town or settlement. Notable examples include Karlovac, Leskovac, Požarevac.

See also
-vic

Place name element etymologies
English suffixes